The Roman Catholic Diocese of Atambua is a Latin suffragan diocese in the Ecclesiastical province of the Metropolitan of Kupang, in Indonesia, yet still dependent of the Roman Congregation for the Evangelization of Peoples.

Its cathedral episcopal see is Katedral Santa Maria Imakulata (dedicated to Mary Immaculate) located in the city of Atambua.

History 
 Established on 25 May 1936 as the Apostolic Vicariate of Dutch Timor, on territory split off from the then Apostolic Vicariate of Lesser Sunda Islands
 Renamed on 11 November 1948 after its see as Apostolic Vicariate of Atambua.
 Promoted 3 January 1961 as Diocese of Atambua, yet still missionary.
 Lost territory on 13 April 1967 to establish the then Diocese of Kupang, now its Metropolitan.

Ordinaries 
(all Roman rite, till 2007 members of a Latin missionary congregation)

 Apostolic Vicar of Dutch Timor  
 Jacques Pessers, Divine Word Missionaries (S.V.D.) (June 1, 1937 – November 11, 1948 see below), Titular Bishop of Candyba (1937.06.01 – 1961.04.03)

 Apostolic Vicars of Atambua  
 Jacques Pessers, S.V.D. (see above November 11, 1948 – January 3, 1961 see below)
 Theodorus van den Tillaart, S.V.D. (November 14, 1957 – January 3, 1961 see below), Titular Bishop of  (1957.11.14 – 1961.01.03)

Suffragan Bishops of Atambua 
 Jacques Pessers, S.V.D. (see above January 3, 1961 – death April 3, 1961)
 Theodorus van den Tillaart, S.V.D. (see above January 3, 1961 – retired February 3, 1984)
 Anton Pain Ratu, S.V.D. (February 3, 1984 – retired June 2, 2007), previously Titular Bishop of  (1982.04.02 – 1984.02.03) & Auxiliary Bishop of Atambua (1982.04.02 – 1984.02.03)
 Dominikus Saku (June 2, 2007 – ...)

Sources and external links
 Official website
GCatholic.org, with incumbent biography links
 Catholic Hierarchy

Roman Catholic dioceses in Indonesia
Christian organizations established in 1936
Roman Catholic dioceses and prelatures established in the 20th century